The Tamil language has absorbed many Indo-Aryan, Prakrit, Pali and  Sanskrit   loanwords ever since the early 1st millennium CE, when the Sangam period Chola kingdoms became influenced by spread of Jainism, Buddhism and early Hinduism.
Many of these loans are obscured by adaptions to Tamil phonology.

There are many words that are common in Sanskrit and Tamil. This is an illustrative list of Tamil words of Indo-Aryan origin, classified based on type of borrowing. The words are transliterated according to IAST system. All words have been referenced with the Madras University Tamil Lexicon, which is used as the most authoritative and standard lexicon by mainstream scholars. In the examples below, the second word is from Tamil, and its original Indo-Aryan source is placed to the left.

Change of final retroflex to dental

ambara - ampala

Loss of initial s

samayaṃ - amaiyam
sabhā - avai

Loss of initial complex consonant (retaining initial vowel)

śṛavaṇa - Āvaṇi (also note loss of initial complex consonant Śr)

Loss of initial complex consonant (introduction of vowel)

ḥṛdaya - itaya (also loss of voicing)

Loss of voicing

agati - akati

Loss of voiced aspiration

adhikāra - atikāra
adhika - atika

Tatsama borrowing

aṇu - aṇu
nīti - nīti

Change of final sibilant to semivowel

Ākāśa - Ākāya

Change of medial sibilants to stops

aśuddha - acutta

Split of complex syllables

agni - akkini (gni to kini, also note loss of voicing)

Others

ahaṃkāram - akankāram
agastya - akattiya
ahambhāva - akampāvam
Āṣāḍha - Āḍi
Ārambha - Ārampam
kāvya - kāppiyam
kārttika - kārttikai
śvāsa - cuvācam
śani - cani
chitra - cittirai
budha - putan
phalguna - pankuni
manas - manatu
mārgaśīrSa - mārkazhi
māgha - māci
vaiśākha - vaikāci

References

Notes

Bibliography

S Vaidyanathan, Indo-Aryan loanwords in old Tamil, Rajan Publishers (1971), ASIN B0000CQQI3 
Chandran Tucker, A dictionary of English loan-words in modern Tamil: Contributions towards a modern Tamil-English dictionary , Biblia Impex (1986), 
R Wallden, Hidden Indo-European and/or Indo-Aryan "Loanwords" in Old Tamil?, Orientalia Suecana Uppsala 1980, vol. 29, pp. 140–156 -

External links
Madras University Tamil lexicon

T
Tamil language-related lists
Tamil Indo-Aryan
Tamil